Eugene Michael Hyman (born May 14, 1950) is an American retired judge, lawyer, and former police officer.

Hyman served on the Superior Court of Santa Clara County for almost 20 years, and is a legal analyst.  He helped create and serves in the field of therapeutic jurisprudence, a philosophy and system that advocates treatment for particular categories of offenders, such as domestic violence, which is his specialty.  Hyman has presided over cases in the criminal, family, probate, civil, and delinquency divisions of the court. He is an opponent of the three-strikes law and considered an "international expert on preventing juvenile, family, and domestic violence".  Hyman was elected and took his oath of office on January 8, 1997. Hyman retired from the bench and was replaced by Shelyna V. Brown.

Hyman is the first American to receive the United Nations Public Service Award. Hyman presided over the first family/juvenile violence court in the United States to focus exclusively on teenage victims and perpetrators.

Early life, education and career
Hyman graduated from Matawan Regional High School in 1968. He graduated from Claremont Men's College with a Bachelor of Arts in Biology in 1972 and received his Juris Doctor degree from the Santa Clara University School of Law in 1977.

From 1972 to 1977, he served as a police officer with the Santa Clara Police Department and from 1979 to 1981 he was an Instructor at the Santa Clara County Peace Officer's Academy.

Legal career
He was in private practice from 1979 to 1990 concentrating on personal injury litigation, workers' compensation law, and criminal law.

Judicial career

1990 to present
In 1990, Hyman was appointed to the Santa Clara County Municipal Court. He has appeared as a legal panelist to governmental, judicial, and other forums concerning domestic violence in the United States, Australia, New Zealand, Canada, and other countries. While in Canberra, Australia during May 2008, Hyman gave a PowerPoint presentation at Australia's Victim Support Act conference. He has published numerous articles on domestic violence.  One of his specialties is in the area of domestic violence cases that also include substance abuse and/or mental health. He also specializes in offenses involving sexual abuse, stalking, strangulation, and other unique circumstances that may co-occur with domestic violence.  Hyman is a proponent of Australia's Three Strikes law.

In 1999, Eugene M. Hyman was chosen to preside over the first juvenile domestic violence and family violence court in the United States.  The court hears only cases "solely with teenage batterers and their victim."

During February 2010, while making a ruling on the bench, Hyman made a comment regarding a boycott of Judge Andrea Bryan.  "I look to my colleague, who is now a subject of much public debate and in some quarters ridicule, and wonder whether or not I would have the courage to do what I thought was right."  In this case involving a murder suspect, Hyman found the individual factually innocent.

Hyman retired in 2011 and was replaced by Shelyna V. Brown.

Television analyst
Hyman has appeared on television and radio shows as a legal analyst.  In 2009, he analyzed the potential domestic violence case concerning Chris Brown and Rihanna. During December 2009, Hyman stated "A large percentage of [DCFS] cases that are investigated are never filed with a court; Such a scenario is particularly likely given the family's celebrity status" inre Charlie Sheen's domestic problems.

In 2010, Hyman was interviewed concerning the death of Allison Myrick and commented on how the legal system fails abusive relationships.

Legal conferences participation
In 2003, Hyman was a panelist on domestic violence the 30th annual Western Society of Criminology in Vancouver, British Columbia, Canada.

During May 2010, Hyman was on the "Developing Therapeutic Judging Panel" representing problem-focused domestic violence courts in East Melbourne, Victoria.

Academic relationship
Hyman is also a lecturer at the Santa Clara University School of Law, where he has taught a Domestic Violence Law Seminar. He has over 20 years of experience as a law instructor.

In 1994, he served as a member of part-time Faculty at the Santa Clara University College of Arts & Sciences teaching Senior Seminar Law and Social Welfare.

In January 2005, as a Visiting Professor in Law, he taught Domestic Violence Law at the University of Western Ontario Faculty of Law in Canada.

Since January 3, 2019, he has served as an Adjunct Associate Professor at the University of Canberra School of Law and serves as the Director of Professional Outreach at the school.

Awards
  (April, 2011). Cable Channel 30 airs stories of people who help to make positive changes in our community.
 The Santa Clara County Domestic Violence Council recognizes Honorable Eugene M. Hyman for his extraordinary commitment and leadership in the arenas of domestic violence and for his role as community leader and inspiration to others. October 15, 2010.
 "Alumni Achievement Award," University of Santa Clara, School of Law, 2003
 On June 23, 2008, Hyman, along with the Santa Clara County Superior Court was honored with the United Nations Public Service Award.  On the same day in the United States House of Representatives, Zoe Lofgren recognized Hyman for the United Nations award.
 In 2004, The Superior Court of California, County of Santa Clara, announced that its Juvenile Domestic and Family Violence Court has been chosen as one of the "Top 50" programs in the 2004 Innovations in American Government Awards competition. Read the press release here.
 "Unsung Heroes" Award from the Victims Support Network, 2004.
 "Alumni Achievement Award," University of Santa Clara, School of Law, 2003
 Inductee, Matawan Regional High School Hall of Fame/Alumni. 2003
 In 2001, The Superior Court of California's Juvenile Domestic and Family Violence Court, headed by Judge Eugene M. Hyman, was honored by the California State Administrative office  as a recipient of the Ralph N. Kleps Award for improvement in the administration of the courts.
 Director's Award, The Human Relations Commission and the Office of Human Relations of Santa Clara County, 2001
 Seventh Annual LACY (Legal Advocates for Children & Youth) Honors for the improvement of legal representation for minors, 2000.
 Patron, The Australian Institute of Public Safety, Melbourne, Australia
 Women's Fund "Man of the Year 1998."  Recognized for efforts in domestic violence prevention.

References

Living people
1950 births
Matawan Regional High School alumni
People from Perth Amboy, New Jersey
21st-century American judges
20th-century American judges
20th-century American lawyers
California state court judges
Santa Clara University School of Law alumni
Santa Clara University alumni